Syriac history may refer to:

 History of the Syriac language, general history of the Syriac language and its variants
 History of Syriac Christianity, history of Syriac Christianity and its branches

See also
 Syriac (disambiguation)
 Syrian (disambiguation)